Donna Benton (born 1975) is an entrepreneur and founder of a UAE-based lifestyle company called The Entertainer.

Biography 

Originally from Melbourne Australia, Benton was born in 1975. In 2000, at age 26, she moved to Dubai to save money.

Her original job in Dubai proved unsuccessful, so she founded a company The Entertainer, offering discounted lifestyle products. , her company was operating in fifteen countries across the Middle East, Asia, Africa and Europe. As well as being the company's founder, she has also served as its CEO and Chairman, a role she currently holds in 2019.

In early 2012, a subsidiary of Abraaj Capital, a regional investment fund, acquired a 50 per cent stake in the company. They announced plans in 2017 to divest their stake.

In May 2018, Benton confirmed the sale of 85% of her company for a nine figure sum to GFH Financial Group.

Benton is also a mother of two children.

Awards 
Benton received Esquire Middle East's Man at His Best Award for her work through The Entertainer. She was also featured among Forbes Middle East's Most Influential Women of 2018.

References 

Australian women business executives
Women from Dubai
Australian businesspeople in retailing
1975 births
Living people
21st-century Australian businesspeople
People from Melbourne
Australian expatriates in the United Arab Emirates
Australian women company founders
Australian company founders